The Socket FS1 is for notebooks using AMD APU processors codenamed Llano, Trinity and Richland (Socket FS1r2).

"Llano"-branded products combine K10 with Cedar (VLIW5), UVD 3 video acceleration and AMD Eyefinity-based multi-monitor support of up to three DisplayPort-monitors.

"Trinity"- and "Richland"-branded products Piledriver with Northern Islands (VLIW4), UVD 3 and VCE 1 video acceleration and AMD Eyefinity-based multi-monitor support of up to four DisplayPort-monitors.

While the AMD desktop CPUs are available in a 722-pin package Socket AM1 (FS1b), it is not clear whether these desktop CPUs will be compatible with Socket FS1 or vice versa.

It is the last pin grid array socket for AMD's mobile processors - all mobile processors in microarchitectures succeeding Piledriver are exclusively available in BGA packaging, for example Steamroller-based mobile processors uses Socket FP3 socket, which is a μBGA socket. Intel also adopted same practice, starting with Broadwell microarchitecture.

Feature overview for AMD APUs

See also
 List of AMD processors with 3D graphics
 List of AMD mobile processors

External links

 Socket FS1 Design Specification

AMD mobile sockets